The London Underground 1973 Stock is a type of rolling stock used on the Piccadilly line of the London Underground. It was introduced into service in 1975 with the extension of the line to Hatton Cross, followed by a further extension to Heathrow Central in 1977. A total of 86 six-car trains were built.

The trains were built by Metro-Cammell between 1974 and 1977, and were refurbished by Bombardier Transportation between 1996 and 2001. They are some of the oldest trains running on the Underground, and in Britain as a whole, second only to the 1972 Stock running on the Bakerloo line.

History

In the early 1970s London Transport placed an order for a new fleet of trains to replace the 1938 Stock and 1959 Stock vehicles which previously operated on the Piccadilly line. Built between 1974 and 1977 by Metro Cammell in Birmingham, the first unit entered service on 19 July 1975 and the last was introduced by 1977. The trains featured longer cars and larger door space than the previous units, being designed for airport travellers with luggage.

The order was for  6-car trains, made up of 196 driving motor (DM) cars, 175 trailer (T) cars and 154 uncoupling non-driving motor (UNDM) cars. Each train is made up of two 3-car units, and most units are single-ended, formed DM-T-UNDM. There are also 21 double-ended units, formed DM-T-DM, to provide additional flexibility and to operate the Aldwych shuttle (now closed).

The initial order included two test units equipped with solid state traction equipment and electronic control systems. These were double-ended units 892-692-893 (delivered 1977) and 894-694-895 (delivered 1979), and were known collectively as the ETT (Experimental Tube Train). The first unit was equipped by Westinghouse, the second by GEC. In order to provide additional units for the opening of the Heathrow loop, these units were converted to standard at Acton Works, entering service between 1986 and 1987.

One three-car unit (166-566-366) was damaged in a terrorist attack on 7 July 2005 and subsequently scrapped.

Refurbishment
From 1996 to 2001, the entire fleet was refurbished by Bombardier Transportation at Horbury railway works. The interior was completely remodelled, with changes including the removal of transverse seating, replacement of the original wooden flooring with new floor material, replacement of straphangers with new grab rails, new enclosures for the ceiling ventilation fans, brighter lighting with new diffusers, installation of car-end windows and new perch seats in the centre of the cars, creating more luggage space for airport passengers.

The original unpainted exterior was painted in London Underground's corporate livery, and a new emergency detrainment system was fitted in the cabs. The external destination blinds were also replaced with LCDs, and these were subsequently replaced with new LED units in 2015.

The final refurbished unit re-entered service on 10 July 2001.

Future replacement

The Deep tube programme (DTP) originally covered the replacement of the trains and signalling on the Bakerloo and Piccadilly lines, and had been expanded to cover rolling stock requirements arising from the planned extension of the Northern line to Battersea, the eventual replacement of Central line trains, and proposed increased service frequency on the Northern and Jubilee lines. The EVO tube concept design, a lighter articulated train with walk-through cars, was introduced early in 2011. 

In early 2014 the Bakerloo, Piccadilly, Central and Waterloo & City line rolling stock replacement project was renamed New Tube for London (NTfL) and moved from its feasibility stage to the design and specification stage. The proposal introduces fully automated trains and signalling to increase capacity first on the Piccadilly line in 2025, followed by the Central, Waterloo & City, and Bakerloo lines by 2033. The fully automated trains may not have drivers. The ASLEF and RMT trade unions that represent the drivers strongly oppose this, saying it would be unsafe.

In June 2018, TfL announced 94 nine-car 2024 stock trains to replace the 1973 Stock. As of early 2021, these are expected to enter service from 2025.

References

External links 

 London Underground 1973 Tube Stock - Tubeprune
 London Transport Museum Photographic Archive
 
 
 
 

1973
Metropolitan Cammell multiple units
Train-related introductions in 1975